Lawrence's Hotel is in Sintra, a UNESCO World Heritage Site, in the Lisbon District of Portugal. Opened by an Englishman in 1764, it is reputedly the oldest, still-functioning, hotel on the Iberian peninsula,  although it has not been open continuously.

History
Named Lawrence’s Hotel after the original owner, the hotel has been sold several times and has undergone several name changes. In 1850 it was called the English Inn. It was purchased after 1880 by an Englishman named Durand, who renamed it after himself. At the end of the 19th Century it was bought by an Irishman, Michael Gallway, who used part of the premises to establish a pastry shop. In 1949 it became the Estalagem dos Cavaleiros  (Knights’ Inn). It closed in 1961 and was not re-opened until the early 1990s having been purchased by a Dutch couple in 1989 who restored the building and returned the hotel to its original name. It changed ownership again in 2016.

Over the years the hotel has played host to some important guests. In 1809 Lord Byron wrote part of his famous work Childe Harold's Pilgrimage while staying there, describing Sintra as a “paradise”. The Portuguese novelist José Maria de Eça de Queirós stayed there on several occasions and made reference to the Lawrence in his novels Os Maias and The Mystery of the Sintra Road. Other Portuguese writers to stay there have included Alexandre Herculano, Ramalho Ortigão, Camilo Castelo Branco, and Álvaro Bulhão Pato. The English writer William Beckford was also a guest as, later, were Bill Clinton and Margaret Thatcher.

References

Hotel buildings completed in the 18th century
Hotel buildings completed in 1764
Sintra